Júlio López may refer to:

Sportspeople
Julio López (rower) (born 1933), Spanish Olympic rower
Júlio López (swimmer) (born 1967), Brazilian Olympic swimmer
Julio Lopez (footballer) (born 1978), Chilean footballer
Julio César López (born 1986), Paraguayan football goalkeeper
Julio López (water polo) (born 1922), Uruguayan water polo player

Other
Julio López Chávez (before 1845–1869), Mexican leader of peasant rebellion

See also
Julián López (disambiguation)
Julia López (disambiguation)
Jorge Julio López (1929–disappeared 2006), Argentine victim of National Reorganization Process